The 56th Annual Tony Awards ceremony was held at Radio City Music Hall on June 2, 2002 and broadcast by CBS. "The First Ten" awards ceremony was telecast on PBS television. The event was co-hosted by Bernadette Peters and Gregory Hines.

The ceremony
The show opened with a tribute to Richard Rodgers, featuring a medley of his songs performed by Marvin Hamlisch, Harry Connick Jr., Michele Lee, Mos Def, Lea Salonga, Peter Gallagher, John Raitt, Bernadette Peters, Gregory Hines, and the company of Oklahoma!  A Broadway/New York song medley was performed by Bernadette Peters and Gregory Hines.

Presentations from nominated musicals:

Into the Woods: "Children Will Listen", "Ever After" and "Into the Woods" - Vanessa Williams, John McMartin, Company
Mamma Mia!: "I Have a Dream", "Money, Money, Money", "Mamma Mia", "Chiquitita" and "Dancing Queen" - Louise Pitre, Judy Kaye, Karen Mason, Tina Maddigan, Company
Thoroughly Modern Millie: "Forget About the Boy"/"Thoroughly Modern Millie" - Sutton Foster, Anne L. Nathan, Casey Nicholaw, Noah Racey, Company
Sweet Smell of Success: "Dirt" - John Lithgow, Company
Urinetown: "Run, Freedom, Run" - Hunter Foster, Spencer Kayden, Jeff McCarthy, Company
Oklahoma!: "The Farmer and the Cowman" - Company

The First Ten awards were presented prior to the full ceremony and broadcast on PBS. The awards presented were: Best Direction of a Play, Direction of a Musical, Book of a Musical, Original Score, Choreography, Costume Design, Lighting Design and Scenic Design. There were also interviews and "rehearsal and performance clips from the nominated shows."

The broadcast won the Emmy Award for Outstanding Directing for a Variety, Music or Comedy Program; the director was Glenn Weiss.

Winners and nominees
Winners are in bold

Special awards
Source: TheaterMania

Regional Theatre Tony Award
Williamstown Theatre Festival
Special Tony Award for Lifetime Achievement in the Theatre
Robert Whitehead
Special Tony Award for Lifetime Achievement in the Theatre
Julie Harris

Multiple nominations and awards

These productions had multiple nominations:

11 nominations: Thoroughly Modern Millie  
10 nominations: Into the Woods and Urinetown  
9 nominations: Morning's at Seven 
7 nominations: Oklahoma! and Sweet Smell of Success
6 nominations: The Crucible and Private Lives 
5 nominations: Mamma Mia! 
3 nominations: Fortune's Fool and Metamorphoses 
2 nominations: The Elephant Man, The Goat, or Who Is Sylvia?, Noises Off, Thou Shalt Not and Topdog/Underdog    

The following productions received multiple awards.

6 wins: Thoroughly Modern Millie 
3 wins: Private Lives and Urinetown 
2 wins: Fortune's Fool and Into the Woods

See also
 Drama Desk Awards
 2002 Laurence Olivier Awards – equivalent awards for West End theatre productions
 Obie Award
 New York Drama Critics' Circle
 Theatre World Award
 Lucille Lortel Awards

References

External links
 Tony Awards Official Site

Tony Awards ceremonies
2002 in theatre
2002 theatre awards
Tony
2002 in New York City
2000s in Manhattan
Television shows directed by Glenn Weiss